Desmomyia is a genus of snipe flies of the family Rhagionidae. They have the antennal scape elongated, longer than the pedicel, and the male hind first tarsomere enlarged. Desmomyia are mid-sized flies  of about 5 to 7 mm and of grey, black, or brownish colour and the legs have some yellow or dark brown to black.

Species
D. sinensis Yang & Yang, 1997 - China
D. thereviformis Brunetti, 1912 - India

References

Rhagionidae
Brachycera genera
Taxa named by Enrico Adelelmo Brunetti
Diptera of Asia